Popular Power was a company founded in January 2000 that sold 
distributed computing software for CPU scavenging.  The company was led by Marc Hedlund, CEO, and Nelson Minar, CTO.

The "Popular Power Worker" software was a downloadable Java-based application that Internet users could install onto their computers.  It allowed users' computers to participate in a non-profit project to develop an influenza vaccine.

Although Popular Power was able to raise $1.6 million in
angel round funding, it was unable to close the venture capital it needed to continue.  As a result, it had to permanently shut down operations in March 2001.

See also 
 Distributed computing

External links 
 You Got the Power (Aug 2000)
 OpenP2P: Popular Power Turns Off the Lights (03/19/2001).

Defunct software companies of the United States
Grid computing products
Software companies established in 2000
Software companies disestablished in 2001